Nadine Gonska (born 23 January 1990) is a German sprinter. She competed in the 200 metres at the 2016 European Athletics Championships.

International competitions

Personal bests
Outdoor
100 metres – 11.36 (+0.5 m/s, Flieden 2016)
200 metres – 23.03 (-0.5 m/s, Kassel 2016)
Indoor
60 metres – 7.28 (Leipzig 2016)
200 metres – 23.30 (Karlsruhe 2015)

References

External links

1990 births
Living people
German female sprinters
Sportspeople from Duisburg
Athletes (track and field) at the 2016 Summer Olympics
Olympic athletes of Germany
Athletes (track and field) at the 2020 Summer Olympics
Olympic female sprinters